Me, Gangster is a 1928 American silent crime film directed by Raoul Walsh. It stars June Collyer, Don Terry, Anders Randolf and a young Carole Lombard.

Cast
June Collyer as Mary Regan
Don Terry as Jimmy Williams
Anders Randolf as Russ Williams
Carole Lombard as Blonde Rosie
Stella Adams as Lizzie Williams
Herbert Ashton as Slicker
Joe Brown as himself
Nigel De Brulier as Danish Louie
Al Hill as Danny
Walter James as Police Capt. Dodd

Production
During the shooting of the picture, only one copy of the script existed, in the possession of director Raoul Walsh.

Casting

Don Terry, appearing on his debut in the film, was discovered at Hollywood's Café Montmartre by Fox screenwriter Charles Francis Coe who happened to see Terry and thought of the screenplay he had just completed. However,  Coe introduced himself to Terry and asked if he was in the film industry.  He gave Terry his business card and invited him to the Fox lot for a screen test. Terry went to the Fox lot expecting only to finally be able to see some film stars.  When Terry's screen test came out of the film laboratory, he was signed as the lead in  Me, Gangster, the screenplay Coe had just written.

An article in Silver Screen notes that Carole Lombard's casting in Me, Gangster finally eased the pressure her family had been putting on her to succeed. She would go on to become a leading Hollywood starlet in the 1930s.

See also
1937 Fox vault fire
List of Fox Film films

Preservation status
No prints appear to survive making it a lost film.

References

External links

Me, Gangster at the Internet Movie Database

1928 films
American silent feature films
1928 crime drama films
American gang films
American gangster films
American crime drama films
Films directed by Raoul Walsh
Lost American films
American black-and-white films
Fox Film films
1928 lost films
1920s American films
Silent American drama films